Oakhill Down Lock is a lock on the Kennet and Avon Canal, at Froxfield, Wiltshire, England between Newbury Bridge and Pewsey Wharf.

The lock has a rise/fall of 5 ft 11 in (1.80 m).

It is a grade II listed building.

References

See also

Locks on the Kennet and Avon Canal

Georgian architecture in Wiltshire
Grade II listed buildings in Wiltshire
Locks on the Kennet and Avon Canal
Canals in Wiltshire
Grade II listed canals